Over the Hills & Far Away: The Music of Sharpe was released in 1996 as a companion to the Sharpe television series. The recording features performances by various artists, including British folk musicians John Tams (who played the supporting role of "Rifleman Daniel Hagman" in the series and wrote or arranged much of its music) and Kate Rusby, composer Dominic Muldowney, and The Band and Bugles of the Light Division, performing traditional songs along with selections of original music from the programmes.

Track listing
"The Overture" a) "Sharpe's Theme" b) "Prelude" (Dominic Muldowney/John Tams, words trad.) featuring Sean Bean) – 2:48
"I'm Ninety Five" (Trad.) performed by The Band and Bugles of the Light Division – :50
""Over the Hills and Far Away" (Trad./Tams) performed by Tams – 3:49
"The Spanish Sword" (Muldowney) – 1:30
"Rogue's March" – (Trad.) performed by Tams/Barry Coope - :33
"The Collier Recruit" (Trad., arranged by Kate Rusby/John McCusker) performed by Rusby – 4:17
"The Bird in the Bush/The Colors" (Trad./Tams/Muldowney) performed by Tams/Moscow Symphony Orchestra/Muldowney – 3:52
"The Spanish Bride" (Tams) performed by Tams – 6:57
"The Shilling" (Muldowney) – 2:00
"Gentleman Soldier" (Trad., arranged by Tams/Roger Wilson) performed by Tams – :35
"Bugle Call/Moneymusk" (Trad.) performed by The Band and Bugles of the Light Division – :51
"Broken-Hearted I Will Wander" (Trad. arranged by Rusby/McCusker) performed by Rusby – 4:20
"Badajoz" (Muldowney) - 3:58
"The Rambling Soldier" (Trad./Tams/Coope) performed by Tams/Coope - 1:43
"The Huntsman's Chorus/The Italian Song" (Trad.) performed by The Band and Bugles of the Light Division - 2:16
"Johnny is Gone for a Soldier" (Trad.) performed by Tams - 3:26
"The Forlorn Hope" (Muldowney) - 2:05
"Love Farewell" (Trad./Tams) performed by Tams - 3:09
"Sunset" (Trad.) The Band and Bugles of the Light Division - 1:38
"Sharpe's Song/Sharpe's Theme" (Trad./Muldowney/Tams) - 1:39

References

Television soundtracks
Sharpe series
Sharpe (TV series)
1996 compilation albums
1996 soundtrack albums
Soundtrack compilation albums